Polgahawela Junction railway station is a major junction station, situated in the Kurunegala District, North Western Province, Sri Lanka. The station is located at the centre of Polgahawela and is a main junction point joining two railway lines; one coming from the upcountry of Sri Lanka and another from the northern part of the country.
The Main Line connects with Kandy, Matale, Nawalapitiya and Badulla.
The Northern Line connects with Anuradhapura, Jaffna, and Kankesanturai, and leads to all other lines in the North.

The station serves as a terminus for several commuter trains, with all local trains and long distance trains running on the Main Line, Northern Line, Trincomalee Line, and Batticaloa Line, stopping at the station. Intercity express trains do not stop at the station.

History 
The Colombo to Kandy railway line (what is now known as the Main line) was extended in stages, with the first stage to Ambepussa completed in December 1864 and the next stage to Polgahawela in November 1866. The railway station was constructed during this period and it opened to the public on 1 November in the same year as an ordinary train station. In 1894, the station became a junction station when a new branch line connecting Polgahawela to Kurunegala was constructed, this was the first section of the Northern line project. The Polgahaela to Kurunegala branch line was officially opened on 14 February 1894 by Governor  Sir Arthur Elibank Havelock.

Continuity

See also
 List of railway stations in Sri Lanka
 List of railway stations by line order in Sri Lanka

References

Railway stations in Kurunegala District
Railway stations on the Northern Line (Sri Lanka)
Railway stations on the Main Line (Sri Lanka)
Railway stations opened in 1866